Yehoshua "Shiye" Feigenbaum (born 5 December 1947) is a former Israeli football player. As a striker, he holds many records with Israel national football team.

Honours

As a Player
Israeli Premier League (2):
1965–66, 1968–69
Israel State Cup (1):
1972
Asian Club Championship (1):
1967

As a Manager
Second Division (1):
1985–86
'''Toto Cup (1):
1994–95

References

External links
 Yehoshua Feigenbaum's International Career RSSSF

1947 births
Living people
Israeli Jews
Footballers from Jaffa
Israeli footballers
Liga Leumit players
Hapoel Tel Aviv F.C. players
Shimshon Tel Aviv F.C. players
Hapoel Jerusalem F.C. players
Hapoel Ramat Gan F.C. players
Hapoel Haifa F.C. players
Israel international footballers
Footballers at the 1968 Summer Olympics
Olympic footballers of Israel
1970 FIFA World Cup players
Israeli football managers
Israeli Premier League managers
Hapoel Haifa F.C. managers
Hapoel Jerusalem F.C. managers
Maccabi Netanya F.C. managers
Hapoel Tel Aviv F.C. managers
Maccabi Petah Tikva F.C. managers
Maccabi Herzliya F.C. managers
Bnei Yehuda Tel Aviv F.C. managers
Hapoel Ironi Rishon LeZion F.C. managers
Hapoel Tzafririm Holon F.C. managers
Maccabi Ahi Nazareth F.C. managers
Bnei Sakhnin F.C. managers
Hapoel Ashkelon F.C. managers
Hapoel Nir Ramat HaSharon F.C. managers
Hapoel Hadera F.C. managers
Hapoel Kfar Saba F.C. managers
Asian Games silver medalists for Israel
Asian Games medalists in football
Association football forwards
Footballers at the 1974 Asian Games
Medalists at the 1974 Asian Games
Israeli people of Austrian-Jewish descent